Aditya is both a given name and a surname. Notable people with the name include:

Given name:
 Adithya Menon, Indian actor
 Aditya (actor), Indian film actor in Kannada cinema
 Aditya Babu, Tollywood producer and actor
 Aditya Chopra, Bollywood movie producer
 Aditya Narayan, Indian singer, actor and television host
 Aditya Jha, Indo-Canadian entrepreneur, philanthropist and social activist 
 Aditya Om, Indian film actor, writer, lyricist, director and producer
 Aditya Pancholi, Bollywood actor   
 Aditya Mittal, CFO Arcelor Mittal, Son of Lakshmi Mittal
 Aditya Vikram Birla, industrialist, founder of Aditya Birla Group
 Wahyu Aditya (born 1972), Indonesian animator
 Aditya Thackeray, Cabinet Minister of Tourism and Environment, Government of Maharashtra

Indian masculine given names